Vavuniya Hindu College ( Vavuṉiyā Intuk Kallūri) is a provincial school in Vavuniya, Sri Lanka.

See also
 List of schools in Northern Province, Sri Lanka

References

External links
 Vavuniya Hindu College

Provincial schools in Sri Lanka
Schools in Vavuniya